This is a list of the members of the 17th Seanad Éireann, the upper house of the Oireachtas (legislature) of Ireland.  These Senators were elected or appointed in 1983, after the November 1982 general election and served until the close of poll for the 18th Seanad in 1987.

Composition of the 17th Seanad 
There are a total of 60 seats in the Seanad. 43 Senators are elected by the Vocational panels, 6 elected by the Universities and 11 are nominated by the Taoiseach.

The following table shows the composition by party when the 17th Seanad first met on 23 February 1983.

List of senators

Changes

See also 
Members of the 24th Dáil
Government of the 24th Dáil

References

External links 

 
17